Buyer & Cellar is a one-man play by Jonathan Tolins. The play premiered at the Rattlestick Playwrights Theater in New York City on April 2, 2013. The production starred Michael Urie and was directed by Stephen Brackett. The same production then opened off-Broadway at the Barrow Street Theatre on June 24, 2013, closing in 2014. Urie won a Clarence Derwent Award for his performance as well as a Drama Desk Award for Outstanding Solo Performance.

Clancy O'Connor was Urie's understudy.

Plot summary 
The play is a one-man comedy that follows Alex More, a struggling gay actor working in Los Angeles, who is down on his luck after being recently fired from Disneyland. He lands a job curating the Malibu basement of Barbra Streisand. (The real-life Streisand constructed a series of "Main Street" storefronts beneath her Malibu barn inspired by the Winterthur Museum in Delaware in order to house her collection of dolls and other trinkets). More at first does not meet his employer, but eventually Streisand comes down to peruse her collection, and the two strike up a friendly relationship. The play chronicles the fictional exchanges between More and his idol, the source of both admiration and frustration on More's part. The entire play is narrated from More's point of view and is presented as a story told to his screenwriter boyfriend Barry.

Performances 
The show was performed and live-streamed by Michael Urie on April 19, 2020. In France, Julien Baptist performed the show in December 2013. In London, Aaron Sidwell performed the show in October 2020.

References

External links 
 New York Times play review
 Official Play Site

2013 plays
American plays
Off-Broadway plays
LGBT-related plays